Thomas Marshall Jackson (January 15, 1884 – February 22, 1967) was an American track and field athlete who competed in the 1908 Summer Olympics. In 1908, he finished twelfth in the pole vault competition.

References

External links
list of American athletes

1884 births
1967 deaths
American male pole vaulters
Olympic track and field athletes of the United States
Athletes (track and field) at the 1908 Summer Olympics
Cornell University alumni